Elite 2 (formerly the Elite Two Championship) is the second tier semi-professional rugby league competition in France below Elite 1, but above the National Division 1. The season runs from September to April. The clubs play each other home and away before entering into a series of play-off matches resulting in a Grand Final. The winners can gain promotion to Elite 1 providing they meet a minimum criteria. Occasionally the runners-up could be offered promotion.

History 

The league was previously called the National League 1 from 1958 to 2002. The Elite Two Championship  was formed in 2002 when the French Rugby League Championship was split into two Elite One and Elite Two. There was no competition in 1987 and in 1988 the league was won on league placings and not by a series of play-offs.

Teams for 2021–22 season

Past winners

See also

Rugby league in France
France national rugby league team
France women's national rugby league team
French Rugby League Championship
Elite 1 (rugby league)
National Division 1
National Division 2
Lord Derby Cup
Coupe Falcou
Paul Dejean Cup
French rugby league system

References

External links
Google map – Elite 2 teams
 French rugby league federation
 Infostreize
 Le monde du rugby à XIII

Rugby league competitions in France
Professional sports leagues in France